Gay-Lussac's law usually refers to Joseph-Louis Gay-Lussac's law of combining volumes of gases, discovered in 1808 and published in 1809.  It sometimes refers to the proportionality of the volume of a gas to its absolute temperature at constant pressure.  This law was published by Gay-Lussac in 1802, and in the article in which he described his work he cited earlier unpublished work from the 1780s by Jacques Charles. Consequently, the volume-temperature proportionality is usually known as Charles's Law.

Law of combining volumes 

The law of combining volumes states that, when gases react together they do so in volume which bears simple whole number ratio provided that the temperature and pressure of the reacting gases and their products remain constant

The ratio between the volumes of the reactant gases and the gaseous products can be expressed in simple whole numbers.

For example, Gay-Lussac found that two volumes of hydrogen and one volume of oxygen would react to form two volumes of gaseous water. Based on Gay-Lussac's results, Amedeo Avogadro hypothesized that, at the same temperature and pressure, equal volumes of gas contain equal numbers of molecules (Avogadro's law). This hypothesis meant that the previously stated result
2 volumes of hydrogen + 1 volume of oxygen = 2 volume of gaseous water
could also be expressed as
2 molecules of hydrogen + 1 molecule of oxygen = 2 molecule of water.

It can also be expressed in another way of example,
100 mL of hydrogen combine with 50 mL of oxygen to give 100 mL of water vapour.
Hydrogen(100 mL) + Oxygen(50 mL) = Water(100 mL)
 
Thus, the volumes of hydrogen and oxygen which combine (i.e., 100mL and 50mL) bear a simple ratio of 2:1.

The law of combining gases was made public by Joseph Louis Gay-Lussac in 1808. Avogadro's hypothesis, however, was not initially accepted by chemists until the Italian chemist Stanislao Cannizzaro was able to convince the First International Chemical Congress in 1860.

In the 17th century Guillaume Amontons discovered a regular relationship between the pressure and temperature of a gas at constant volume. Some introductory physics textbooks still define the pressure-temperature relationship as Gay-Lussac's law. Gay-Lussac primarily investigated the relationship between volume and temperature and published it in 1802, but his work did cover some comparison between pressure and temperature. Given the relative technology available to both men, Amontons was only able to work with air as a gas, where Gay-Lussac was able to experiment with multiple types of common gases, such as oxygen, nitrogen, and hydrogen. Gay-Lussac did attribute his findings to Jacques Charles because he used much of Charles's unpublished data from 1787 – hence, the law became known as Charles's law or the Law of Charles and Gay-Lussac.

Amontons's law, Charles's law, and Boyle's law form the combined gas law. These three gas laws in combination with Avogadro's law can be generalized by the ideal gas law.

Expansion of gases
Gay-Lussac used the formula acquired from ΔV/V = αΔT to define the rate of expansion α for gases. For air he found a relative expansion ΔV/V = 37.50% and obtained a value of α = 37.50%/100°C = 1/266.66°C which indicated that the value of absolute zero was approximately 266.66°C below 0°C. The value of the rate of expansion α is approximately the same for all gases and this is also sometimes referred to as Gay-Lussac's Law.

See also

References

Further reading 
 
 
 

Gas laws

de:Thermische Zustandsgleichung idealer Gase#Gesetz von Amontons
ga:Dlí Gay-Lussac